

Table of Bishops

References 
Law and Gospel: The Hallmark of Classical Lutheranism                     
Rev. Dr. Carl E. Braaten   

 A Reformed Account of the Law-Gospel Distinction Rev. Dr. Michael S. Horton                                      

North American Lutheran bishops
Lists of Protestant bishops and archbishops